On October 3, 1962, a boiler exploded in a New York Telephone Company building in Upper Manhattan, killing 23 people and injuring 94.

References

1962 disasters in the United States
Explosions in 1962
1962 in New York City
Boiler explosions
Inwood, Manhattan
Disasters in New York City
October 1962 events in the United States
1960s in Manhattan
Explosions in the United States
History of telecommunications in the United States